The Robustos were an American ska band based in Atlanta. Formed after The Skats & The Go Steadys broke up, their name is a reference to the type of cigar. Their style evolved from traditional ska to include more soul and jazz influences. They stopped playing in 2000.

Members
Tonya Abernathy - Vocals
Brett Rakestraw - Tenor Saxophone
Chad Paulin - Trumpet
Jonathan Lloyd - Trombone
Rob Kincheloe - Guitar, Vocals
Elizabeth Morris - Guitar
Jay Wallace - Bass
Andy Bauer - Drums
Bob Birdsong - Keys, Vocals

The band reunited for two nights in June, 2007 to sold-out shows in Atlanta.

Discography
Introducing…The Robustos (1997, Ska Satellite Records)
The New Authentic (1999, Beatville Records)

External links
Band's homepage
Beatvile Records Artist page
Album page at Answers.com

American ska musical groups